Singaporean Americans are Americans of Singaporean descent.
There is a small community of Singaporeans in the United States, consisting largely of expatriate professionals from Singapore and their families as well as international students. The bulk of Singaporeans in the United States reside in metropolitan areas along a coastline, with the highest population located within the corridor connecting Boston, New York and Washington DC. On the West Coast, most Singaporean Americans live within several hundred miles of Los Angeles and the San Francisco Bay Area. The next highest concentrations are in Texas, followed by an enclave by the Great Lakes, near Chicago and Ann Arbor.

Singaporeans in Chicago
Singaporeans have been coming to the Chicago area for work and school since the late 1960s. While a small number of families have settled permanently, the majority of Chicago's Singaporeans remain for short periods on visas as students or professionals. While the number of Singaporeans has fluctuated over time, community leaders estimated that between 200 and 300 Singaporeans lived in Chicago in 2000.

The Singaporean community in Chicago is close and well organized. Chicago Singaporeans come together for two major celebrations every year, the Chinese New Year and Singapore National Day. Food plays a central role in these events and is culturally important for Singaporeans, who spend a lot of time and effort to obtain authentic food.

Top 10 U.S. metropolitan areas with large Singaporean Americans population

Notable people
 Ng Chin Han – Hollywood actor
 Ronny Chieng – Comedian and actor
 Ross Butler – Actor
 Neeraj Khemlani – Co-president of CBS News and CBS Television Stations
 Shin Lim – Magician
 Boon Thau Loo – Academic administrator, University of Pennsylvania
 Corrinne May – Musician, singer and songwriter
 Julia Nickson-Soul – Actress
 Sharon Tay – Journalist
 Michael Yani – Tennis player
 Gwendoline Yeo – Actress, musician and writer
 Daniel Chong – Animator, writer, director, producer and the creator of Cartoon Network's We Bare Bears
 Stuart Tay - Murder victim

See also

 Singapore–United States relations

References

Asian-American society
Southeast Asian American
Singaporean emigrants to the United States
Singaporean diaspora